The 1987 Volvo Classic  was a women's tennis tournament played on indoor carpet court at the Brighton Centre in Brighton, England that was part of the 1987 Virginia Slims World Championship Series. It was the 10th edition of the tournament and was held from 19 October until 25 October 1987. Second-seeded Gabriela Sabatini won the singles title and earned $40,000 first-prize money.

Finals

Singles
 Gabriela Sabatini defeated  Pam Shriver 7–5, 6–4
 It was Sabatini's 2nd singles title of the year and the 4th of her career.

Doubles
 Kathy Jordan /  Helena Suková defeated  Tine Scheuer-Larsen /  Catherine Tanvier 7–5, 6–1

References

External links
 International Tennis Federation (ITF) tournament event details
 Tournament draws

Daihatsu Challenge
Brighton International
Volvo Classic
Volvo Classic